Şenyurt is a village in the Amasra District, Bartın Province, Turkey. Its population is 216 (2021).

History 
The name of the village is mentioned as Zurnacı in the records of 1928.

Geography 
The village is 30 km from Bartın city center and 15 km from Amasra town centre.

References

Villages in Amasra District